Great Academy Ashton (formerly New Charter Academy) is a coeducational secondary school  with academy status in Ashton-under-Lyne, Greater Manchester, England.

The school was formed on 1 September 2008 as a result of a merger between Hartshead Sports College and Stamford High School. New Charter Academy was originally split between the two former school sites, but moved to a new £40 million sole campus in September 2011.

Great Academy Ashton is part of the Great Academies Education Trust which also includes Copley Academy and Silver Springs Primary Academy, both in Stalybridge.

Great Academy Ashton is sometimes informally known as GAA and used to be called New Charter Academy up until September 2017.
 
The school was placed in special measures in January 2017 and as a result the former headteacher left. The current headteacher has been working at the school since April 2017.

Notable former pupils

Hartshead County Secondary School
 David Potts, CEO, Morrisons

References

External links
Official website
 Great Academies Education Trust

Secondary schools in Tameside
Academies in Tameside
Educational institutions established in 2008
2008 establishments in England